Piano Reductions Vol. 1 is an instrumental album produced by Steve Vai. This is an album of 11 solo acoustic piano interpretations of Vai songs by fellow Zappa alumnus Mike Keneally. It was recorded and released in 2004. This Is Volume 6 in "The Secret Jewel Box".

Track listing 
All songs written by Steve Vai, except "Pig" by Devin Townsend & Steve Vai

References 

Steve Vai albums
2004 compilation albums
Mike Keneally albums
Instrumental rock compilation albums
Epic Records compilation albums